Ban-de-Sapt is a commune in the Vosges department in Grand Est in northeastern France.

Points of interest
 Jardins de Callunes

See also
Communes of the Vosges department

References

Communes of Vosges (department)